Autaritus (died 238 BCE) was a leader of Gallic mercenaries in the Carthaginian army during the First Punic War.

With his men Autaritus fought in 262 BCE at the Battle of Agrigentum and remained loyal to Carthage when his countrymen defected en masse to the Romans. After his return to Africa he was one of the leaders of the mercenaries rebelling against Carthage in the Mercenary War of 240.

With Autaritus' gifts as an orator and his knowledge of Phoenician, he incited his men to particular savagery, and was the instigator of the massacre of the Carthaginian commander Gisco and his men. Eventually he was trapped in a canyon at the Battle of the Saw by the Carthaginian general Hamilcar Barca, and surrendered. Together with other mercenary leaders, he was crucified before the walls of Tunis.

Footnotes

References

Celtic warriors
Gaulish people
Carthaginian commanders of the First Punic War
Ancient mercenaries
People executed by crucifixion
Year of birth unknown
238 BC deaths